Frederick Charles Ashford (22 April 1909 – November 2004) was a British industrial designer, known also as Frederick Charles.

Works
 Designing For Industry : Some Aspects of the Product Designer's Work, 1955
 The Aesthetics of Engineering Design, 1969

References

1909 births
2004 deaths
British industrial designers